The 1944 Brooklyn Tigers season was their 15th and final season in the league before merging with the Boston Yanks. The team failed to improve on their previous season's output of 2–8, losing all ten games. They failed to qualify for the playoffs for the 13th consecutive season.

After the season, the players and assets of the franchise were merged with the Yanks, and continued to carry on the legacy of the last remaining Ohio League founding APFA member Dayton Triangles, the erratic franchise that currently operates as the Indianapolis Colts.

Draft

Schedule

Standings

References

Brooklyn Dodgers (NFL) seasons
Brooklyn Tigers
Brooklyn
1940s in Brooklyn
Flatbush, Brooklyn